Yusuke Kosai (小斉 祐輔, born April 30, 1983 in Matsubara, Osaka) is a Japanese professional baseball infielder for the Tohoku Rakuten Golden Eagles in Japan's Nippon Professional Baseball.

External links

NPB.com

1983 births
Fukuoka SoftBank Hawks players
Japanese baseball players
Living people
Nippon Professional Baseball infielders
Baseball people from Osaka Prefecture
Tohoku Rakuten Golden Eagles players
People from Matsubara, Osaka